Tiryns culture (2,200 - 2,000 BC) or Early Helladic III was an Early Bronze Age culture in Central Greece, Southern Greece and the Ionian islands (Part of Western Greece) that followed Eutresis and Korakou cultures, and preceded the Mycenean civilization. The "center" of the culture was the settlement of Tiryns that saw further development during the Mycenean period.

 Metal and Terracotta: A unique pattern-painted dark to light human figurine appears in Tiryns culture's Lerna IV while old types of animal figurines do not continue. Metal is now more popular for the creation of weapons and tools, some examples are : A dagger, a nail, a pin from Lerna and three axes from Thebes.
 Pottery: The best known type of pottery consists of two classes of pattern-painted ceramics : 1) Patterned ware that is a dark on light class, mainly in the Peloponnese. The ornament is geometric and almost exclusively rectilinear. 2) Ayia Marina ware that is a light on dark class, mainly in Central Greece. The ornament is similar to patterned ware. The dark paint on both wares is moderately lustrous and appears to be descended directly from the Urfirnis paint on Early Helladic II period.
 Architecture: At Lerna and Olympia several "long houses" (megara) with two or three rooms and narrow alleyways are built. A tumulus is constructed over the ruins of the Helladic II House of the Tiles and for a long period no buildings are built in the specific area. Many large (for their period) buildings are constructed in Lerna but they often last for only one generation.
 End: In around 2,000 BC, Early Helladic III and generally the Early Helladic periods end. Tiryns culture is followed by the Middle Helladic culture and Mycenaean Greece.

References

Archaeology of Greece
Helladic civilization